Serra de la Valldàngel or Serra de la Vall d'Àngel, (also known as Sierra de Valdancha), is a mountain range in the Baix Maestrat comarca, Castellón Province, Valencian Community, Spain.

Its highest summit is Tossal d'en Canes (715 m), being slightly higher than neighboring Talaies d'Alcalà's highest summit. Another important peak is 520 m high El Cavall.
 
The range is named "Valley of the Angel" after the Ermita de la Mare de Déu dels Àngels de Sant Mateu, a church on a hill dedicated to the Virgin Mary of the angels. Its southern and southeastern limit is within Alcalà de Xivert's municipal term. The Talaies d'Alcalà mountains form a natural boundary at the southeastern end of the range.

Description
The range stretches inland in a NE - SW direction east of Sant Mateu and La Salzadella. The intermittent river Rambla d'Alcalà has its origin in the Serra de la Vall d'Àngel.  
The range is covered with low Mediterranean forest and Maquis shrubland. Parts of the lower slopes are planted with olive, almond and carob trees.

Geologically the Serra de la Valldàngel belongs to the Iberian System, being part of the system's easternmost foothills, but its NE - SW orientation is clearly that of the Catalan Mediterranean System.

History
The Ermita de la Mare de Déu dels Àngels was built in the 17th century. It is one of the most important landmarks of neighboring Sant Mateu town.

This mountain range was the scenario of violent battles both during the Third Carlist War (1872–76) in the 19th century and again in 1938 during the Spanish Civil War when rebel faction troops, after splitting the Spanish Republican government territory in two, tried in vain to reach Valencia, for the practically defeated Republican army opposed ferocious resistance in these mountains. The war would, however, be over just a few months later.

See also
Maestrat/Maestrazgo
Mountains of the Valencian Community

References

External links

El País Valencià poble a poble; comarca a comarca - El Baix Maestrat

Vall d'angel
Baix Maestrat
Vall d'angel